Never Take Friendship Personal is the second studio album by alternative rock band Anberlin, released on February 1, 2005 on Tooth & Nail Records. Its singles were "A Day Late" and "Paperthin Hymn" and music videos have been made of each. "(The Symphony of) Blasé" is sometimes referred to as "Amsterdam". The album's name is inspired by when the band chose to remove guitarist Joey Bruce.

The song "Dance, Dance Christa Päffgen" was inspired by multi-talented artist Nico, whose given name was Christa Päffgen. The song references her struggle with drugs and unrelated death.

Critical reception

Never Take Friendship Personal garnered positive reception from Music critics. Johan Wippsson of Melodic rated the album four stars, remarking how this "is a fantastic album and a great follow up, even better than their great debut." At Christianity Today, Andy Argyrakis rated the album four stars, highlighting how the album is "for those seeking an artfully made and engagingly played project, just not ideal for those looking for faith based edification" on which the music has "sophisticated alternative sonics, ample hooks and sweeping melodies." Rick Anderson of Allmusic rated the album four stars, affirming that it is "Very highly recommended overall." At Cross Rhythms, Tony Cummings rated the album eight squares out of ten, proclaiming that "Seldom has art rock worn such an accessible sheen." Scott Weber of AbsolutePunk rated the album an eighty-eight-percent, stating that the band has the "ability to construct such beautiful songs with euphoric vocals." At Jesus Freak Hideout, John DiBiase rated the album four stars, calling it a "solid sophomore effort from these experts of catchy, hooky alternative rock." Punknews.org's Anchors rated the album four stars, noting the album as "one hell of a guilty pleasure." At CCM Magazine, Louis R. Carlozo graded the album a B−, cautioning that "while its individual songs (and sing-along hooks) often satisfy, fails to transcend a formulaic plateau."

Track listing

Note: In August 2011 while doing a Q&A on AbsolutePunk.net, Stephen Christian spoke of "New Fast Automatic", a demo song that was recorded during the Never Take Friendship Personal sessions saying, "A while back I posted lyrics to an old blog of mine. On there were lyrics to a song called 'New Fast Automatic'. After Anberlin's Twitter account got blown up with how to get that song we figured we should try and dig it up! And Joey was amazing and mixed it all up." The download link was posted in the Q&A as well as on Christian's Twitter account. The song has never been officially released.

Personnel

Anberlin
Stephen Christian – lead vocals, keyboards
Joseph Milligan – lead guitar
Nathan Strayer – rhythm guitar, vocals
Deon Rexroat – bass guitar
Nathan Young – drums, percussion

Production
Aaron Sprinkle – producer, engineer
JR McNeely – mixing
Troy Glessner – mastering
Brandon Ebel – executive producer

Additional musicians
Phil Sneed – additional vocals ("The Runaways")
Seth Roberts – additional vocals ("Stationary Stationery")
Ryan Clark – unclean vocals ("Never Take Friendship Personal")
Mike Weiss – guitars ("Dance, Dance, Christa Päffgen")

Artwork
Jeff Gros – photography
John Deeb – band photography
Asterik Studio – art direction & design
Kris McCaddon – Anberlin logo

'Management
Kyle Griner – Management for Arson Media Group, Inc
Melody King – Booking Agent for The Agency Group, Ltd
Chad Johnson – A&R
Mike McKoy – Legal for Serling Rooks & Ferrara, LLP

References

External links

Anberlin albums
2005 albums
Tooth & Nail Records albums
Albums produced by Aaron Sprinkle